Kaiserthum, or modern German Kaisertum, is a German word for Empire in its meaning as a state ruled over by an Emperor, used in the 18th and 19th centuries. It is most known as a description of the Empire of Austria after its creation in 1804.
A later used German term for it is "Kaiserreich".

See also
Empire
Austrian Empire
Kingdom of Hungary (1526–1867)
German language

References

Austrian Empire
German words and phrases